Midnight Alibi is a 1934 pre-Code crime comedy-drama directed by Alan Crosland, produced by First National Pictures, distributed by Warner Bros. and starring Richard Barthelmess. Midnight Alibi is an adaptation of Damon Runyon's 1933 short story The Old Doll's House.

Barthelmess plays a gangster who returns to New York after some time in Europe and falls in love with Joan (Dvorak), unaware that she's the younger sister of his bitter rival, Angie the Ox (Barrat). After an attempted hit on him, he seeks refuge in the home of an old lady (Lowell), who tells him of her own romance many years ago with a man who looked just like him (also Barthelmess; Chandler plays her in the flashback). Their friendship will prove useful later when he's accused of murder.

This was Barthelmess' last film for First National after a 15-year run at the studio. Jack Warner was anxious to get rid of him because the grosses of his films no longer justified his $250,000 salary.

A print of the film is preserved at the Library of Congress. The film is also available on DVD on Demand from the Warner Archive.

Cast
Richard Barthelmess as Lance McGowan
Ann Dvorak as Joan
Helen Chandler as Abigail
Helen Lowell as The Old Doll
Henry O'Neill as Ardsley
Robert Barrat as Angie the Ox
Robert McWade as Senator
Purnell Pratt as Wilson
Harry Tyler as Hughie
Paul Hurst as Babe the Butcher
Arthur Aylesworth as Louie the Blind Man
Vincent Sherman as Black Mike

References

External links

1934 films
Films directed by Alan Crosland
Warner Bros. films
Films scored by Heinz Roemheld
American black-and-white films
1934 crime drama films
American crime drama films
American romantic drama films
1934 romantic drama films
1930s American films